Ayrton Senna EP is the self-produced second extended play by Spanish alternative dance band Delorean, released in 2009 by Mushroom Pillow. Fool House distributed it worldwide. The title is named after the famous Brazilian Formula One driver. The EP received positive reviews from critics. The song "Deli" was featured in NBA 2K11.

Track listing
There are two different versions of this EP, one contains:

Whilst the other contains:

References

2009 EPs
Delorean (band) EPs
Cultural depictions of Ayrton Senna